A total lunar eclipse took place on Monday, February 20, 1989, the first of two total lunar eclipses in 1989.

Visibility 

It was completely visible from Australia and most of Asia. It was visible setting in eastern Africa and Europe. In the Philippines, the lunar eclipse was very visible throughout the country since the modern lunar eclipse happened on July 26, 1953.

It was also preceded by the twin total lunar eclipses on April 24, 1986 and October 17, 1986. The next one happened on February 9, 1990.

Relation to other lunar eclipses

Eclipses of 1989 
 A total lunar eclipse on February 20.
 A partial solar eclipse on March 7.
 A total lunar eclipse on August 17.
 A partial solar eclipse on August 31.

Lunar year series (354 days)

Tritos series

Saros series (18 years 11 days) 

It last occurred on February 10, 1971 and will next occur on March 3, 2007.

Metonic cycle (19 years) 

This is the third of five Metonic lunar eclipses.

Saros series

It last occurred on January 29, 1953 and will next occur on February 20, 1989.

Half-Saros cycle
A lunar eclipse will be preceded and followed by solar eclipses by 9 years and 5.5 days (a half saros). This lunar eclipse is related to two total solar eclipses of Solar Saros 130.

See also 
List of lunar eclipses
List of 20th-century lunar eclipses

Notes

External links 
 

1989-02
1989 in science
February 1989 events